The Katherine Dunham Company, a troupe of dancers, singers, actors and musicians, was the first African-American modern dance company. Founded in Chicago, it grew out of Ballet Nègre, a student troupe founded in 1930 by Katherine Dunham (1909–2006), which later became the Negro Dance Group.

The company had successful runs on Broadway and in other major American cities. In a New York Times review on February 19, 1940, dance critic John Martin wrote of Dunham: "Her performance with her group last Sunday at the Windsor Theatre may very well become a historic occasion, for certainly never before in all efforts of recent years to establish Negro dance as a serious medium has there been so convincing and authoritative an approach."

Beginning in the 1940s, Dunham took her troupe on a series of highly acclaimed world tours. The Dunham Company helped launch the career of many African-American performers of the day. Dunham alumni include Alvin Ailey, Rosalie King, Frances Davis, Eartha Kitt and Walter Nicks. Classes in Dunham Technique are still taught in New York City at both the 92nd Street YMHA and at the Fashion Institute of Technology, by former company member Dana McBroom-Manno. McBroom-Manno was a featured dancer in the Metropolitan Opera's production of Aida, choreographed by Katherine Dunham, the first African-American choreographer at the Met since Hemsley Winfield set the dances for The Emperor Jones in 1933.

Successful revues featuring the company included the universally acclaimed 1946 production Bal Nègre.

See also
 Modern dance
 Postmodern dance
 20th-century concert dance
 List of dance companies

References

External links
"Katherine Dunham on Overcoming 1940s Racism". Katherine Dunham speaking at a June 6, 2002, Jacob's Pillow Dance Festival PillowTalk.
 Katherine Dunham timeline - includes information about the development of her company.
 

African-American dance
Dance companies in the United States